Kozhikode North is a city suburb in the Kozhikode district in Kerala, India. It includes suburbs on the northern side of the city up to Koyilandy town.

Suburbs and villages
Chelannur
Eranhikkal
Kakkodi
Kakkur
Westhill
Makkada
Nanmanda
Parambil Bazar
Pavayil
Thalakkulathur
 Thuruthyad
 Kappad Beach
 Vengalam
 Vellayil
 Purakkattiri
 Karaparamba
 Pavangad, Kozhikode
 Vengeri

Purakkattiri
Purakkattiri is an important road junction near Thalakkulathoor. Shri Palora Shiva temple is a popular religious destination of Purakkattiri. It is about two km west of Purakkittiri town. The road to the river takes you to the temple after crossing the newly built Highway.  There is a small underpass for crossing the highway. The temple is built inside a calm residential zone and has sylvan surroundings.  It is east facing and is a little elevated from the road.

Vengalam Junction 

Vengalam township has risen to importance because of the completion of the new road from Ramanattukara to Vengalam with a 45-meter width.  The proposed inauguration of the road on 21 January 2016 will boost the development of the area.

Location

See also
 Kozhikode city
 Kozhikode South
 Kozhikode East
 Kozhikode Beach
 Kozhikode District

References

Suburbs of Kozhikode